The Robert F. Kennedy Awards for Excellence in Journalism is a journalism award named after Robert F. Kennedy and awarded by the Robert F. Kennedy Center for Justice and Human Rights. The annual awards are issued in several categories and were established in December 1968 by a group of reporters who covered Kennedy's campaigns.  Winners are judged by more than 50 journalists each year, led by a committee of six independent journalists. The awards honor reporting "on issues that reflect Robert F. Kennedy's concerns, including human rights, social justice and the power of individual action in the United States and around the world. Entries include insights into the causes, conditions and remedies of injustice and critical analysis of relevant public policies, programs, attitudes and private endeavors." The awards are known as the "poor people's Pulitzers" in media circles.

Recipients
Note: This list of winners is incomplete.

1969–1979
1969

The first awards were presented by Kennedy's widow, Ethel Kennedy.

 Network TV: CBS for "Black History: Lost, Stolen or Strayed", written by Perry Wolf and narrated by Bill Cosby.
 Magazine: David Nevin, Life magazine for "These Murdered Old Old Mountains."
 Newspaper: Nick Kotz of The Des Moines Register and Tribune for coverage of rural poverty and hunger.

1970
The second annual awards were presented at the Federal City Club in Washington, D.C., with multiple awardees in each category.

 National TV:
 ABC News for "Black Fiddler: Prejudice and the Negro," produced by Stephen Fleischman.
 NBC News for "Between Two Rivers," narrated by Tom Pettit, from the First Tuesday series.
 Honorable Mention: Group W for "The shame of Welfare," produced by Dick Hubert.
 Local TV:
 WRC-TV for "Perspective: New Set of Eyes," produced by Bill Leonard.
 KNXT-TV for "The Siesta is Over (Revisited)," produced by Ken Rosen.
 Honorable Mention: WCKT-TV for "Migrant Workers," news director Gene Strul.
 Radio:
 WJR for "I Am Not Alone," reported by Phil Jones.
 Honorable Mention: WAKY for "Soul Searching," produced by Bob Watson.
 Newspaper:
 Linda Rockey for a series on the problems of hunger in the Chicago Sun Times.
 Dallas Kinney and Kent Pollock of the Palm Beach Post-Times for "Migration to Misery," an eight-part series on the life and dreams of migrant farm workers.

Articles in Series:
 "They Live Unwanted, in the Shadows of Society", October 5, 1969
 "A Perpetual Cycle Traps the Migrant", October 6, 1969
 "Squeezing Out a Living", October 7, 1969
 "For $50 a Month: A One-Room Shed, No Toilets", October 8, 1969
 "Migrant Gets What's Left", October 9, 1969
 "An Elderly Migrant Who Waits to Die", October 10, 1969
 "Bubba Boone: A Migrant Out of the Stream", October 11, 1969
 "The County's Effort Expansive But Not Enough", October 12, 1969

 Magazines:
 Fred C. Shapiro for "The Whitmore Confessions" in The New Yorker.
 Honorable Mention: Dr. Robert Coles and Harry Huge for a series of reports in The New Republic on the problems of the disadvantaged.

1971
The third annual awards were presented by Ethel Kennedy during a luncheon ceremony held at the John F. Kennedy Center for the Performing Arts in Washington, D.C., which was still under construction.  Entertainer Bill Cosby was the master of ceremonies, and Tim Wickers of The New York Times gave the keynote speech.  The winners were selected from over 275 entries. No awards were given in the Radio and Magazines categories.

 TV:
 NBC News for "Migrant: An NBC White Paper" with correspondent Chet Huntley, produced by Martin Carr.
 Richard Hubert, Paul Galan, Rod MacLeish, Westinghouse Broadcasting Company for "When You Reach December."
 Newspapers:
 Ralph Looney of the Albuquerque Tribune for the nine-part series "The Plight of the Navajo."
 Sam Washington and Jerome Watson of the Chicago Sun-Times for a series on schools for the intellectually disabled.
 Special awards:
 Ruben Salazar of the Los Angeles Times for a collection of 17 columns that "communicated effectively and compassionately the culture and alienation of Chicanos." The award was accepted by Salazar's widow, Sally.
 The New Thing, an arts and architecture workshop in Washington, D.C., for the film "This Is the Home of Mrs. Levant Graham, the New Thing."

1972
The fourth annual awards were presented by Rose Kennedy during a luncheon ceremony at the John F. Kennedy Center for the Performing Arts. Ralph Nader gave the keynote speech. Eligibility was expanded to include high school entries.

 TV:
 Paul Altmeyer and the Urban America Unit of Group W for "The Suburban Wall," a documentary on discrimination in suburban housing narrated by Rod MacLeish.
 Radio:
 Doug Fox of KTOK for "The Business of Being Black," a five-part series on the economic problems of African Americans in Oklahoma City.
 Newspapers:
 Patrick Zier and Joanna Wragg of The Ledger for the four-part series "Crisis in Public Housing" about public housing issues in Lakeland, Florida.
 John Nordenheimer of The New York Times for a story about an African American Medal of Honor recipient who was killed during a holdup at a grocery store in Detroit, Michigan.
 Article:
 "From Dakto to Detroit: Death of a Troubled Hero", May 26, 1971
 Magazines:
 Edward Kosner, Peter Goldman, and Don Holt of Newsweek for "Justice on Trial," a series on the criminal justice system.
 Beekman Winthrop for a story on intestinal parasites in children that was published in New South.
 Honorable mention print:
 Robert Raisch and Neil Scott of United World Press Cooperative for the entire October 21, 1971, issue of Rama Pipien: A People's Media, Ingest Digest.
 Honorable mention college:
 Al Benson of The Spectrum (State University of New York at Buffalo) for "Health Care Crisis".

1973
The fifth annual awards were presented by Ethel Kennedy with the assistance of her brother-in-law, Senator Edward Kennedy. Harvard psychiatrist Robert Coles gave the keynote address. The awardees were chosen from 418 entries, including 61 high school and 37 college entries.

 Newspapers:
 Jean Heller of the Associated Press for a series entitled "The Tuskegee Syphilis Study" exposing a federal experiment that left a number of infected African American men untreated.
 Citation: Agustin Gurza, editor of LaVoz del Pueblo in Hayward, California.
 Citation: Mike Masterson, editor of the Newport Daily Independent in Newport, Arkansas.
 Citation: Jack Brimeyer, Max Winter, Telegraph-Herald, Dubuque, Iowa, "The Rosebud Reservation".
 Radio:
 Citation: Producer Mucio Carlon and the University of Arizona's public radio station KUAT for "What it's Like," a weekly program for ethnic minorities.
 TV:
 Geraldo Rivera of WABC-TV for "Willowbrook: The Last Disgrace," a documentary about the effects of budget cuts on Willowbrook State School for intellectually disabled children in New York City. The documentary led Governor Nelson Rockefeller to restore funding to the school.
 Citation: Thomas Norton for "Migrants of Central Illinois," an episode of the CIA Reports documentary series produced by WCIA. The documentary focuses on migrant workers in the Hoopeston, Illinois, area.

1974
The sixth annual awards were presented by Ethel Kennedy. Frances Farenthold gave the keynote speech.  The awardees were selected from 432 entries.

 Citation – High School:
 Tarl Oliason, co-editor of The Chieftain, the newspaper of Pocatello High School in Pocatello, Idaho, for stories on racial equality and confrontation between black and white students at the school.
 Joseph Hearst III, co-editor of The Chieftain, for stories and editorials on a conflict between Idaho State University's Native American Student Association and Pocatello High School over a Native American symbol at the high school.
 Magazine:
 John Guinther of Philadelphia Magazine for "The Only Good Indian."
 Newspaper:
 Dolores Katz and Jo Thomas of the Detroit Free Press for an 18-part series, "Psychosurgery on Trial".
 Citation: Gloria Delgado of the Express and News for coverage of the Liza Guerra kidnapping.
 Honorable mention: Mike Royko, Chicago Daily News, "Faceless Veteran".
 Honorable mention: Hope Spencer, Newsday, "The Victims".
 Radio:
 Honorable Mention: WCAU Radio for "Abortion: An Investigative Report."
 Honorable Mention: WJR for "Manhunt Scars Community."
 Citation: Rudolph Brewington of WWDC for "Diagnosis: Desperate - A report on Health Care for Minority Americans"
 Citation: William Diehl of ABC Radio for "Why Did Patti Have To Die?"
 Citation, print:
 Jane Daugherty of the St. Petersburg Times for a 15-part series on Pinellas County, Florida, nursing homes.
 TV:
 Robert C. Dotson of WKY-TV for "Through the Looking Glass Darkly," a documentary about the history of African-American civil rights in Oklahoma from before statehood to 1973.
 Honorable Mention: McGraw-Hill Broadcasting Company and KGTV-10 for "La Raza – The People."
 Citation: Carlos Aguilar of WOAI-TV for "Fiesta Patrias".

1975
The seventh annual awards were presented by Ethel Kennedy and Haynes Johnson. Harry Golden gave the keynote address. The awardees were selected from approximately 300 entries.

 Magazine:
 Loretta Schwartz of Philadelphia Magazine for "Nothing to Eat".
 Newspaper:
 Executive editor Mike Masterson of the Hot Springs Sentinel-Record for continuing coverage of the problems of the disadvantaged.
 Print – Honorable Mention:
 Francie Barnard of the Fort Worth Star-Telegram for "Congressional Discrimination," a series exposing discrimination in congressional hiring.

Articles in Series:
 "Discrimination Found In Congressional Jobs Orders",  August 18, 1974
 "Justice Department Will Not Investigate Hiring", August 19, 1974
 "Job-Order Forms Termed Authentic", August 20, 1974

 Print – Citation:
 Nancy Greenberg of the Philadelphia Evening and Sunday Bulletin for "The Indomitable Sondra Diamond."

 Melinda Foote of The Palm Beach Post for "The Bittersweet Harvest," a series about the problems of Jamaican laborers brought each year to Palm Beach County, Florida, to cut sugar cane in the Everglades.

Articles in Series:
 "The Bittersweet Harvest", November 24, 1974
 "Selecting the Cane Cutters", November 25, 1974
 "It's Filthy, Back-Breaking Work", November 26, 1974
 "Time Off", November 27, 1974
 "The Economics of a Bittersweet Harvest", November 28, 1974

 Radio:
 Terence Gurley of WWVA Radio in Wheeling, West Virginia, for "Back to Bloody Harlan."
 Television:
 Martin Berman, Peter Lance, and Geraldo Rivera of WABC-TV for “The Willowbrook Case: The People vs. The State of New York."
 Television – Citation:
 Hill Mermont of WGTV in Athens, Georgia, for "The Bikinians."
 Luis R. Cano, Philip Cano, Roberto Gutierez, and Willie Navarro of the Association for the Advancement of Mexican Americans and KTRK-TV for “The Aztecas and Their Medicine: A Chicano Legacy."

1976
 Radio: Bob Cain, Cathleen Gurley, WWVA Radio, Wheeling, West Virginia, "Care and Feeding of America".
 TV: Tom Pettit, NBC News, "Feeding the Poor".
 TV honorable mention: Dan Rather, John Sharnik, Peter Poor, CBS News, "CBS Reports: The I.Q. Myth".
 Print honorable mention: William Heffernan, Stewart Ain, New York Daily News, series on child care.

1977
 Grand prize and print: Acel Moore and Wendell Rawls, Jr., Grand Prize, for their coverage of the Fairview (PA) Hospital for the Criminally Insane in The Philadelphia Inquirer
 TV citation: Thom Dickerson, Lee Meredith, KTRK, Houston, Texas, "Requiem for a Dying Neighborhood", a documentary which described the decay in an area located in downtown Houston.
 TV citation: Ed Fillmer, KYTV, Springfield, Missouri, "The Retirement Trap".
 Print citation: Editorial staff, The Lake Placid News, New York, "Rebirth of Mohawk Nation or Illegal Land Grab".
 Honorable mention, college student: Christopher DeSalvo, Southern Illinois University, series on Laotian refugees.
 Honorable mention, college student: Bob Minnocci, West Virginia University, series on mental health.
 Honorable mention, print: Loretta Schwartz, Boston Magazine, Chicago Magazine, Philadelphia Magazine, various articles.
 Honorable mention, print: Edward T. Pound, Pam Zekman, Chicago Sun-Times, "Chicago's Money Merchants".
 Honorable mention, TV: William H. Willson, KCET, Los Angeles, "Handle with Care and Dignity".
 Honorable mention, TV: Bob Dotson, WKYC-TV, Cleveland, "The Urban Reservation".
 Honorable mention, TV: Sy Perlman, NBC, "Weekend" series on Sawyer Brothers.

1978
 Grand prize and TV: Bill Moyers, Tom Spain, Howard Stringer, Dan Lerner, CBS, "CBS Reports: The Fire Next Door".
 Print: Jonathan Neumann, William K. Marimow, The Philadelphia Inquirer, "Police Violence".
 TV citation: Jack Hill, KAIT-TV, Jonesboro, Arkansas, "Is There Any Hope for Hope Street".
 Print citation: Staff, Shreveport Journal, "Piney Woods Poverty".
 College student citation: New Expression newspaper, Youth Communication, Chicago.
 Honorable mention, print: Louie Gonzalez, Oakland Tribune, "I Was an Illegal".
 Honorable mention, print: Huge Aynesworth, John Bloom, Robert Montemayor, Howard Swindle, Paul West, Bryan Woolley, Dallas Times Herald, series on Castroville.
 Honorable mention, high school student: Jane Lincoln, Urban Journalism Workshop, 1310 Magazine, "A Walk Through Mt. Pleasant".
 Honorable mention, TV: Nancy Thurber, Robert Thurber, WPBT-TV, Miami, "God Gives You Years".

1979
 Grand prize and print prize: Fredric N. Tulsky, Nancy Weaver, Don Hoffman, The Clarion-Ledger, Jackson, Mississippi, "North Mississippi Justice".
 Radio: Steven L. McVicker, Jeanne Jones Riedmueller, KPFT, Houston, "The Question of Accountability: A Look at the Houston Police Department".
 Honorable mention, TV: Brian Ross, Janet Pearce, Joseph Angotti, NBC Nightly News, segment on migrant farm workers.

1980–1989
1980
 Grand prize and print: Chester Goolrick, Paul Lieberman, Lee May, Charlene P. Smith-Williams, Steve Johnson, The Atlanta Constitution, "The Underpaid and the Underprotected".
 Radio: Greg Barron, David Carlton Felland, KSJN, Minnesota Public Radio, "The Way to 8-A".
 TV: Howard Husock, Robert Ferrante, WGBH, "Community Disorder: Racial Violence in Boston".
 Citation, college student: Ron Hall, Pepperdine University, "A World of His Own".
 Citation, college student: Annals Kraft, Northern Virginia Community College, "Granny Hickory Stick".
 Honorable mention, photojournalism: Andrea Brunais, The Tampa Times, Florida, "Racism in Hillsborough County Schools".
 Honorable mention, photojournalism: David Olinger, Concord Monitor, New Hampshire, "Adrift".
 Honorable mention, print: Polly Ross Hughes, "D" magazine, Dallas, Texas, "Poor Man's Justice".
 Honorable mention, radio: Mark Poindexter, KCUR-FM, Kansas City, Missouri, "Missouri's Migrants".
 Honorable mention, TV: Dan Rather, Leslie Edwards, Don Hewitt, CBS News "60 Minutes", "Equal Justice".
 Honorable mention, TV: Philip Scheffler, CBS News "60 Minutes", "In the Mainstream".
 Honorable mention, TV: Stephen Fleischman, Richard Richter, Pamela Hill, ABC News "Close Up", "Nobody's Children".

1981 
 Radio: Martin Teichner, Peter Wells, Clarence Fanto, CBS Radio Network (Newsmark), "Exodus: The Freedom Flotilla".
 TV: Joe Bergantino, Clarence Jones, Melissa Malkovitch, Lance Heflin, WPLG-TV, Miami, "The Billion Dollar Ghetto".
 Photojournalism: Len Lahman, Sharon Myers, Times-Advocate, Escondido, California, "Faces Beyond the Fence".
 Honorable mention, radio: John Merrow, Barbara Reinhardt, National Public Radio (Options in Education), "Race Against Time: School Desegregation".
 Honorable mention, TV: Susan Kinney, Bill Ruth, KRMA-TV, Denver, "Haunted House".
 Honorable mention, TV: Ken Swartz, WHAS-TV, Louisville, Kentucky, "When Can We Come Home".
 Citation, radio: Al Allen, WJLB-FM, Detroit, "Crime by Color: Black on Black".
 Citation, TVAlvin H. Perlmutter, Imre Horvath, Marc Brugnoni, Patrick Fahey, Martin Smith, Kalima Soham, WQED, Pittsburgh PBS, "Adoption in America".

1982
 Photojournalism: Jerry Lower, Southern Illinoisan, Carbondale, "A Touch of Nature".
 Photojournalism: Jay B. Mather, Louisville Courier-Journal, "She Ain't Stopping Now".
 College student: Jill Schoenstein, The Daily Pennsylvanian, University of Pennsylvania, "A Rough Education".
 Radio: Bill Buzenberg, National Public Radio, "All Things Considered", "Immigration and Refugees".
 TV: Mark Potter, Lance Heflin, WPLG-TV, Miami, "Human Cargo".
 Honorable mention, high school student: Leah Bryant, Sally Harris, West High School, Bakersfield, California, "Do You Know Where Your Grandparents Are?"
 Honorable mention, TV: Gil Noble, Susan Robeson, Doug Har, WABC-TV, New York, "Essay on Drugs".
 Honorable mention, photojournalism: Patt Blue, Life magazine, "Multiple Sclerosis: A Lingering Nightmare".

1983
 Radio: Bill Leslie, Mike Edwards, Donna Jones, Pamela Hart, Nancy Lyons, Steve Shumake, WRAL, Raleigh, North Carolina, "Five Faces of Poverty".
 TV: Jonathon Dann, Greg Lyon, Ken Swartz, KRON-TV, San Francisco, "The War Within".
 Cartoons: Don Wright, Miami News.
 College student: Renee Jacobs, Pennsylvania State University, "Cynthia's Case".
 Citation, cartoon: Sam C. Rawls, The Atlanta Constitution
 Citation, TV: Susan Lavery, Bill Lord, KTUV, Salt Lake City, Utah, "Criminal Illness".
 Citation, photojournalism: Karen Kasmauski, Virginian-Pilot/Ledger-Star, Virginia, "Lanette: A World of Her Own".
 Citation, photojournalism: Patt Blue, Life magazine, "Getting off Welfare."
 Honorable mention, print: John Hanchette, Carlton Sherwood, Brian Gallagher, Gannett News Service, "Oklahoma Shame".
 Honorable mention, TV: Martin Freeth, Dick Boydell, Sheila Hayman, WGBH, Boston, "Finding a Voice".
 Honorable mention, TV: Diane Baker, Rick Ridgeway, Home Box Office, "To Climb a Mountain".

1984
 Grand prize and TV: Peter Karl, Doug Longhini, Joe Paszcky, Bonnie van Gilder, WMAQ, Chicago, "Beating Justice: A Special Report".
 Photojournalism: April Saul, The Philadelphia Inquirer, "The Gift of Family".
 Print: George Getschow, The Wall Street Journal, "Dirty Work".
 Radio: Patrick Cassidy, WMAQ Radio, Chicago, "School Says You're Retarded".
 Citation, print: Rob Wilkins, Sandusky Register, Ohio, "Hunger and Hope".
 Citation, print: Steve Konicki, Luisa Yanez, The Miami News, "The Cuban Quintas".
 Citation, photojournalism: Bruce Chambers, Glenn S. Capers, Mari Shaefer, P.K. Weis, Tucson Citizen, "Land in Torment".
 Citation, photojournalism: Carol Guzy, The Miami Herald, "Little Haiti".
 Citation, TV: Carol M. Rosenbaum, Virgilio Argimedes, Miriam Thomas, WTVD-TV, Durham, North Carolina, "Poverty Has a Woman's Face".
 Citation, TV: Lee Luse, KCTA-TV, St. Paul, Minnesota, "The Legacy of Baby Doe".
 Honorable mention, cartoon: Bill Day, The Commercial Appeal, Memphis, "Government Assistance".
 Honorable mention, radio: Art Silverman, Verta Mae Grosvernor, National Public Radio, "Daufuskie".
 Honorable mention, TV: Don Hewitt, Suzanne St. Pierre, Morley Safer, CBS News "60 Minutes", "Lenell Geter's In Jail".
 Honorable mention, photojournalism: Carol Guzy, Miami Herald, "Wishbook".
 Honorable mention, photojournalism: Mary Ellen Mark, Life magazine, "Streets of the Lost: Runaway Kids".
 Honorable mention, print: Neil Henry, The Washington Post, "The Black Dispatch."
 Honorable mention, college student: Hal Wells, Columbia Missourian, University of Missouri, "Leading an Active LIFE".
 Honorable mention, college student: Phil Kuntzy, University of Florida, "The Discriminating Paddle".
 Honorable mention, high school student: Monique Craig, Interhigh Connection, Washington, D.C., "Washington's Hungry: A Capital Disgrace".

1985
 Grand prize and TV: David Fanning, Mark Obenhaus, PBS "Frontline", "Living Below the Line".
 Print: Staff of The Charlotte Observer, series on North Carolina's mental health system.
 College student: Kevin Davis, The Daily Illini, University of Illinois, "Prison Aftermath".
 Photojournalism: Cheryl McCall, Mary Ellen Mark, Life magazine, "Camp Good Times".
 Photojournalism: Lynn Johnson, Life magazine, "Kenny's World".
 TV: Christopher Jeans, David Fanning, Charlie Cobb, PBS "Frontline", "Bread, Butter and Politics".
 Citation, print: Jim Auchmutey, Mike Christiensen, The Atlanta Journal-Constitution, "Poverty 1984".
 Citation, print: Melvin Claxton, The Virgin Islands Daily News, "Public Housing / Public Shame".
 Citation, college student: Georgea Kovanis, University of Michigan, "Overcoming Barriers at the U".
 Citation, high school student: Alexei A. Waters, Leavenworth Senior High School, "Tony Roe Overcomes Blindness".
 Citation, high school student: A. Claire Palvagasi, Lakewood High School, "Trying to Share America's Wealth".
 Citation, radio: Diana Quinn, David Rush, Velma Cato, NBC Radio Network "The Source", Home Sweet Homeless / The Invisible People".
 Honorable mention, print: Marc Kaufman, The Philadelphia Inquirer, "The Hmong: At the Mercy of America".
 Honorable mention, college student: Janet Rae, Michigan Daily Weekend, University of Michigan, "Vagrants or Victims".
 Honorable mention, photojournalism: Mary Ellen Mark, Life magazine, "The Cruelest Crime".
 Honorable mention, radio: Anne Marshall, Mike Edgerly, WHAS Radio, Louisville, Kentucky, "Go Tell Sargent Shriver: The Life and Death of the War on Poverty in Eastern Kentucky".
 Honorable mention, TV: Malcolm Clarke, Japhet Asher, HBO, "Soldiers in Hiding".

1986
 Grand prize and print: Staff of The Chicago Tribune, "The American Millstone".
 Photojournalism: Tom Gralish, The Philadelphia Inquirer, "How They Survive".
 Radio: Scott Simon, Neva Grant, Ina Jaffe, National Public Radio, "A State of Emergency".
 TV: Special projects staff, WSMV-TV, Nashville, "Reflections in Black and White".
 Citation, cartoon: Mike Peters, Dayton Daily News
 Citation, print: Douglas Pardue, Roanoke Times and World News, "Forgotten Houses, Forgotten People".
 Citation, TV: Dan Medina, KHJ-TV, Los Angeles, "Our Children: The Next Generation".
 Citation, photojournalism: John Keating, Dallas Times Herald, "Thalidomide Victim".
 Honorable mention, cartoon: H. Clay Bennett, St. Petersburg Times.
 Honorable mention, photojournalism: Stephen Shames, APF Reporter / The Philadelphia Inquirer, "Child Poverty in America".
 Honorable mention, photojournalism: Sarah Leen, The Philadelphia Inquirer, "Losing Max: Living With Alzheimer's".
 Honorable mention, radio: Frank Raphael, Peter Laufer, Lynn Peterson, Rusty Lutz, NBC Radio Network, "A Loss for Words".
 Honorable mention, TV: Jeanne Bowers, Bruce Johnson, Sandra Butler, Tim DeLuca, LaGeris Bell, Mike Trammell, WDVM-TV, Washington, "Out of Sight, Out of Mind".
 Honorable mention, print: Nina Bernstein, The Milwaukee Journal, "Justice Denied".

1987
 Grand prize and print: Steve McGonigle, Ed Timms, The Dallas Morning News, "Discrimination in Juries".
 Photojournalism: David Leeson, Dallas Morning News, "Hungry and Homeless".
 College student: Joyce Mendel, University of New Mexico, "The Land Is So Sacred to Us".
 High school student: Salome Junco, Seward Park High School, New York, "Illegal Aliens: I Am Very Frightened Every Day".
 Radio: Craig Cheathem, WLAP-AM, Lexington, Kentucky, "Passing on the Secret of Sexual Abuse".
 TV: David Fanning, Mark Obenhaus, Edward Gray, WGBH-TV, Boston, "Growing Up Poor".
 Citation, photojournalism, April Saul, The Philadelphia Inquirer, "Survived by a Daughter".
 Citation, TV: Marilyn Deutsch, Gary Schiedel, KOAP-TV, Portland, Oregon, "The Tiniest Junkies".
 Honorable mention, college, Rick Wartzman, Northwestern University / The Boston Globe, "When Mentally Ill Become Violent, Few Have Easy Solutions".
 Honorable mention, high school, Nellie Park, Truman High School, Independence, Missouri, "Drumm Farm Gives a Second Chance".
 Honorable mention, print: Jenni Bergal, Kiki Bochi, Fred Schulte, News/Sun-Sentinel, Fort Lauderdale, Florida, "Suffer the Children".
 Honorable mention, cartoon: Bill Day, Detroit Free Press, "The Color Black 'n' Blue".
 Honorable mention, radio: Steve Shomaker, KMOX Radio, St. Louis, Missouri, "A Bankrupt Heritage".
 Honorable mention, TV: Lori VanKirk, Brenda Buratti, Boyd Levet, KGW-TV, Portland, Oregon, "In Search of Home".

1988
 Grand prize and print: Alex Kotlowitz, The Wall Street Journal, "Urban Trauma".
 Photojournalism: Donna Ferrato, Dick Polman, Philadelphia Inquirer, "Domestic Violence Part I".
 College student: Larry Lee, Columbia Missourian, University of Missouri, "Rich Land, Poor People".
 Citation, TV: Barry Ahrendt, Jeanne Blake, Jimmy Frances, WBZ-TV, Boston, "AIDS: The Paul Cronan Story".
 Citation, print: Staff writer, The Sacramento Bee, "Hunger in California".
 Honorable mention, print: Tracy Thompson, Larry Copeland, The Atlanta Journal-Constitution, "Rural Justice".

1989
 Grand prize and print: Bill Dedman, The Atlanta Journal-Constitution, "The Color of Money".
 International: Colin Campbell, Deborah Scroggins, The Atlanta Journal-Constitution, "The Weapon of Famine".
 College student: Staff, Golden Gater, San Francisco State University, "Helpers in the War on AIDS".
 Radio: Dan Morris, Lynn Neary, National Public Radio, "625 K Street".
 TV: Bill Moyers, Elena Mannes, Public Affairs Television, "Promises! Promises!".
 Citation, photojournalism: Jon Kral, The Miami Herald, "Gangs".
 Citation, TV: Molly Bedell, Bill Kurtis, WBBM, Chicago, "Getting Out, Staying Out".
 Citation, print: Susan Faludi, The San Jose Mercury News, "The Preemie at 6."
 Honorable mention, photojournalism: Eugene Richards, Life magazine, "Crack: The Downfall of a Neighborhood".
 Honorable mention, print: Staff, The Chicago Tribune, "Chicago Schools: Worst in America".
 Honorable mention, radio: Tatiana Schreiber, Calley Crosley, Eileen Bolinsky, "Places Like This: Women In Prison".
 Honorable mention, TV: David Davis, Christine LaBeau, KCTS, Seattle, "Skid Road".

1990–1999
1990
 Grand Prize: The Fort Myers News-Press for "Far From the Dream"
 Print Prize: Charles Flowers and Pete Gallagher, The Seminole Tribune for coverage of the wrongful conviction of James Joseph Richardson
 Citation, TV: Al Briganti, Andrew Heyward, staff, CBS "48 Hours", "No Place Like Home".
 Honorable mention, cartoon: Mike Peters, The Dayton Daily News.

1991
 Grand prize and print: Jane Daugherty, Jeanne May, Bernie Shellum, The Detroit Free Press, "Workers and Risk".
 International: Peter Jennings, Leslie Cockburn, ABC News, "Peter Jennings Reports from the Killing Fields".
 Citation, international: Janice Tomlin, Tom Jarriel, Victor Neufeld, ABC News "20/20", "Nobody's Children: The Shame of a Nation".
 Citation, print: Lori Hall, Diane Conners, Bill Echlin, Anne Gertiser Stanton, Tom Care, Will Scott, Michelle Worobec, The Traverse City Record-Eagle, Michigan, "Faces of Poverty".
 Honorable mention, print: Eileen McNamara, Dolores King, Michale McDonald, The Boston Globe, "Birth in the Death Zones".
 TV Journalism: Jean Walkinshaw, “Children of the Homeless,” 1991-04-30, SCCtv, American Archive of Public Broadcasting

1992

1993 
 Grand prize and print: Paul McEnroe, Allen Short, The Minneapolis Star Tribune, "Licensed to Abuse".
 International photojournalism: Howard Castleberry, Houston Chronicle, "Somalia: A Nation at the Abyss".
 International print: Dudley Althaus, Houston Chronicle, "The New Awakening".
 TV: David Fanning, June Cross, WBGH "Frontline", Boston, "A Kid Kills".
 First Prize International Radio: Amy Goodman & Allan Nairn, "Massacre: The Story of East Timor"
 Honorable mention, print: Edward Pratt, The Advocate, Baton Rouge, Louisiana, "Can We Save Our Black Children".
 Honorable mention, photojournalism: Jon Marc Taylor, The Prison Mirror, "Pell Grants for Prisoners".
 Honorable mention, photojournalism: Al Diaz and Carl Juste, The Miami Herald for "Wish Book", 
 Honorable mention, cartoon: Don Wright, The Palm Beach Post, "Perot for President".
 Honorable mention, college student: Laura Paynter, Rome News-Tribune, Georgia, "Welfare Is My Mama".

1994 
 Grand prize and print: Staff, The Chicago Tribune, "Killing Our Children".
 TV: Alan Raymond, Susan Raymond, Home Box Office, "I Am a Promise".
 International print: Molly Moore, John Anderson, Julia Preston, Lena Sun, Caryle Murphy, The Washington Post, "Third World, Second Class".
 International radio: Michael Skoler, National Public Radio, "A Prayer for Burundi".
 International TV: Ron Allen, Diego Grinaldi, Jane Hartney, Steve Schnee, ABC News, "World News Tonight: Sudan Famine".
 Radio: Alyne Ellis, Donna Limerick, Johanna Cooper, National Public Radio "Horizons", "Taking Care of Undocumented Kids".
 International photojournalism: Honorable Mention, The Miami Herald for "Immigration Hope and Despair"
 Student: Nils Rosdahl, Christine Labang, Kathy Hostetter, Lori Vivian, Justin Smith, Ryan Bronson, Patricia Snyder, The Sentinel, North Idaho College, "Learning Challenges".
 Honorable mention, international print: M.C. Burns, Herald-Journal, Syracuse, New York, "Somalia's Sorrow".
 Honorable mention, international radio: Daniel Zwerdling, National Public Radio, "AIDS in Zambia".
 Honorable mention, photojournalism: Robin Donina, St. Petersburg Times, "Portraits of a Plague".

1995
 Print: Leon Dash, The Washington Post, "Rosa Lee's Story".
 Photography: Brian Peterson, Star Tribune, "Testing the Human Spirit".
 International print: Barbara Demick, The Philadelphia Inquirer, "Logavina Street".
 International radio: Tom Gjelten, Michael Sullivan, National Public Radio, "Sarajevo: Another Winter of War".
 International TV: Jim Wooten, ABC News, "Jim Wooten Report from Rwanda".
 International: David Leeson, The Dallas Morning News, "Angola".
 Radio: Maria Hinojosa, National Public Radio, "Jail Seen as a Rite of Passage".
 Student: Kevin Shockley, Kenneth Eich, KBIA-FM, University of Missouri-Columbia, "Helping Hands".
 TV: Meredith Viera, Michele Riorden-Read, ABC News "Turning Point", "Sean's Story: A Lesson in Life".
 Special recognition, TV: "Hoop Dreams: The Documentary".
 Honorable mention, cartoon: Mike Luckovich, The Atlanta Constitution.
 Honorable mention, international radio, Betty Rogers, Alyne Ellis, Donna Limerick, National Public Radio, "Horizons: Behind the Smile, Child Prostitution in Thailand".
 Honorable mention, international television: Demetria Kalodimos, Pat Slattery, WSMV-TV, Nashville, "Hope for 100,000".
 Honorable mention, photography: Carol Guzy, The Washington Post, "Haiti: Out of the Darkness, a Whisper of Hope".
 Honorable mention, print: Deborah Yetter, Courier Journal, Louisville, Kentucky, "Juvenile Treatment Centers".
 Honorable mention, international print: David Lamb, Bob Drogin, John Balzar, John-Thor Dahlburg, The Los Angeles Times, "Genocide and Horror in Rwanda".
 Honorable mention, radio: Mary Jeffries, WHAS, Louisville, Kentucky, "Her Brother's Keeper: A Portrait of Sister Kathleen".
 Honorable mention, TV: DeWitt Sage, David Fanning, WGBH "Frontline", Boston, 'A Place for Madness".
 Ted Rall of Chronicle Features

1996
 Photography: Steve Jessmore, The Saginaw News, "Blind Faith"

1997
 International TV: Stone Phillips, Grace Kahng, Neal Shapiro, NBC "Dateline", "Toy Story".
 Cartoon: Doug Marlette, Newsday.

1998
 Lifetime achievement: Gene Roberts.
 Grand prize and domestic print: Mario Rossilli, Josh Zimmer, The Clarion Ledger, Jackson, Mississippi, "AIDS Hope: Mississippi's Despair".
 Grand prize runner-up, international TV: Mandy Jacobson, Cinemax, "Calling the Ghosts".
 Domestic photojournalism: Clarence Williams, Los Angeles Times, "Orphans of Addiction".
 Domestic photojournalism: Daniel A. Anderson, Motel Children
 Dan Perkins (Tom Tomorrow)
 Domestic print: Sonny Kleinfeld, The New York Times, "A Room of His Own".
 Domestic radio: Shirley Jahad, Shomari Kress, Cecilia Vaisman, Gary Covino, Mary Gaffney, Johanna Zorn, WBEZ-FM, Chicago, "Picture Me Rolling".
 Domestic TV: John Baynard, Tom Ryder, Denny Houghton, Judith Stoia, Clint Bramesco, WGBH, Boston, "Holding On: A Love Story from the Streets".
 International print: Nicholas D. Kristof, The New York Times, "Everyday Killers".
 International radio: Jennifer Ludden, Loren Jenkins, Michael Sullivan, Paul Glickman, National Public Radio, "Coverage of Rwanda and Zaire / Congo".
 International photojournalism: Joe Stefanchik, The Dallas Morning News, "A Hidden Danger".
 College student: Melody Martz, The Sentinel, North Idaho College, "The Coeur d'Alene Tribe Comes Home".
 High school student: Andrea Prisby, Elise Erickson, The Vantage Point, Hudsonville High School, Michigan, "Picking Apples and Learning English".
 Runner-up, TV, CBS "60 Minutes", "Strive".
 Honorable mention, domestic radio: Joe Richman, National Public Radio, "Teenage Diaries".
 Honorable mention, international print: Robin Wright, The Los Angeles Times, "The Global Disadvantaged".

1999
 Grand prize: Mary Hargrove, Linda Satter, Patrick Henry, The Arkansas Democrat Gazette, "Juvenile Justice: The War Within".
 Domestic radio: Laurie Block, Jay Allison, National Public Radio, "Beyond Affliction: The Disability History Project".
 Domestic cartoon: Joel Pett, The Lexington Herald Leader.
 Domestic TV: Tom Bettag, John Baynard, ABC News "Nightline", "Street Doctors".
 International print: Bay Fang, U.S. News & World Report, "China's Stolen Wives".
 International TV: Sheila Nevins, Kate Blewett, Brian Woods, HBO, "Innocents Lost".
 International photojournalism: Ben Van Hook, Life magazine, "Roberto / When I Learned to Dance".
 Honorable mention, domestic TV: Bill Whitaker, Robert Hollander, CBS News "Sunday Morning", "Something in the Air".

2000–2009
2000
The 32nd Annual Awards were awarded in 2000 for coverage in 1999. Award winners were:

2001
The 33rd Annual Awards were awarded in 2001 for coverage in 2000. Award winners were:

2002
The 34th Annual Awards were awarded in 2002 for coverage in 2001. Award winners were:

2003
The 35th Annual Awards were awarded in 2003 for coverage in 2002. Award winners were:

2004
The 36th Annual Awards were awarded in 2004 for coverage in 2003. Award winners were:

2005
The 37th Annual Awards were awarded in 2005 for coverage in 2004. Award winners were:

2006
The 38th Annual Awards were awarded in 2006 for coverage in 2005. Award winners were:

2007
The 39th Annual Awards were awarded in 2007 for coverage in 2006. Award winners were:

2008
The 40th Annual Awards were awarded in 2008 for coverage in 2007. Award winners were:

2009
The 41st Annual Awards were awarded in 2009 for coverage in 2008. Award winners were:

2010–2020
2010
The 42nd Annual Awards were awarded in 2010 for coverage in 2009. Award winners were:

2011
The 43rd Annual Awards were awarded in 2011 for coverage in 2010. Award winners were:

2012
The 44th annual award winners:

2013
The 45th annual award winners:

2014
The 46th annual award winners:

2015
The 47th annual award winners:

2016
The 48th annual award winners:

2017
The 49th annual award winners:

2018
The 50th annual award winners:

2019
The 51st annual award winners:

2020
The 52nd annual award winners:

2021-2022

2021
The 53rd annual award winners:

2022
The 54th annual award winners:

References

External links
Official website

1968 establishments in the United States
American journalism awards
Awards established in 1968
Robert F. Kennedy